Gunnar Vilhelm Rönström (25 January 1884 – 5 July 1941) was a Swedish track and field athlete who competed in the 1906 Summer Olympics, in the 1908 Summer Olympics, and in the 1912 Summer Olympics.

In 1906 he finished fifth in the high jump competition and seventh in the long jump event. In the 100 metres competition he was eliminated in the first round. Two years later he finished tenth in the long jump event.

In 1912 he participated in the decathlon competition but retired after four events.

References

External links
Profile

1884 births
1941 deaths
Swedish male sprinters
Swedish male high jumpers
Swedish male long jumpers
Swedish decathletes
Olympic athletes of Sweden
Athletes (track and field) at the 1906 Intercalated Games
Athletes (track and field) at the 1908 Summer Olympics
Athletes (track and field) at the 1912 Summer Olympics
Olympic decathletes
20th-century Swedish people